Sun Xu (born December 22, 1983 in Changchun) is a Chinese ice dancer. He competes with Qi Jia. They are the 2002 & 2003 Chinese national silver medalists and the 2001 national bronze medalists. Their highest placement at an ISU championship was 10th at the 2002 Four Continents Championships.

Results
(with Qi)

External links
 

Chinese male ice dancers
1983 births
Figure skaters from Changchun
Living people
Competitors at the 2005 Winter Universiade